Yardbird Suite is an album by saxophonist Frank Morgan which was recorded in 1988 and released on the Contemporary label.

Reception

The review by Allmusic's  Scott Yanow said: "Altoist Frank Morgan explores his bebop roots on this infectious set  ... Morgan pays tribute to Bird, yet does not copy him (although he has the ability to sometimes sound very similar to Parker). This spontaneous session has its subtle surprises and is often hard-swinging. Recommended".

Track listing 
All compositions by Charlie Parker except where noted
 "Yardbird Suite – 7:55
 "A Night in Tunisia" (Dizzy Gillespie, Frank Paparelli) – 6:23
 "Billie's Bounce" – 7:21
 "Star Eyes" (Gene de Paul, Don Raye) – 7:14
 "Scrapple from the Apple" – 6:03
 "Skylark" (Hoagy Carmichael, Johnny Mercer) – 6:43
 "Cheryl" – 7:49 Additional track on CD release

Personnel

Performance
Frank Morgan – alto saxophone
Mulgrew Miller – piano
Ron Carter – bass
Al Foster – drums

Production
Orrin Keepnews – producer
Danny Kopelson – engineer

References 

Frank Morgan (musician) albums
1988 albums
Contemporary Records albums
Charlie Parker tribute albums
Albums produced by Orrin Keepnews